Roman Jebavý and Jaroslav Pospíšil won the title, beating Ruben Gonzales and Sean Thornley 6–4, 6–3

Seeds

Draw

Draw

References
 Main Draw

Doubles
Svijany Open doubles